The Mughal–Maratha Wars, sometimes referred to as a whole as the Deccan War, the Maratha War of Independence, or the Twenty-Seven Years' War were a set of wars fought between the Mughal Empire and the Maratha Empire from 1680 until the death of Aurangzeb in 1707.

This war began in 1680 by Mughal Emperor Aurangzeb's invasion of the Maratha enclave in Bijapur, which was established by the Maratha leader Shivaji. The war expended a 100,000 Mughal troops annually, and thrice that number in horses, elephants and other beast of burden each year. After the death of Aurangzeb, Marathas defeated the Mughals in Delhi and Bhopal, and extended their empire up to Peshawar by 1758.

Marathas under Sambhaji (1681–1689)

Sambhaji, the eldest son of the Maratha warrior king Shivaji, was executed in 1689 at the age of 31. His death was a significant event in Indian history, marking the end of the golden era of the Maratha Empire. Sambhaji was born in 1657 to Shivaji and his first wife, Saibai. He was trained in the art of warfare from a young age and was known for his bravery and military skills. After Shivaji's death in 1680, Sambhaji ascended to the throne of the Maratha Empire. In the first half of 1681, several Mughal contingents were dispatched to lay siege to Maratha forts in present-day Gujarat, Maharashtra, Karnataka, and Madhya Pradesh. The Maratha Chhatrapati Sambhaji provided shelter to the emperor's rebel son Sultan Muhammad Akbar, which angered Aurangzeb. In September 1681, after settling his dispute with the royal house of Mewar, Aurangzeb began his journey to Deccan to conquer the Maratha Empire. He arrived at Aurangabad, the Mughal headquarters in the Deccan and made it his capital. Mughal contingents in the region numbered about 500,000. It was a disproportionate war in all senses. By the end of 1681, the Mughal forces had laid siege to Fort Ramsej. But the Marathas did not succumb to this onslaught. The attack was well received and it took the Mughals seven years to take the fort. In December 1681, Sambhaji attacked Janjira, but his first attempt failed. At the same time one of the Aurangzeb's generals, Husain Ali Khan, attacked Northern Konkan. Sambhaji left Janjira and attacked Husain Ali Khan and pushed him back to Ahmednagar. Aurangzeb tried to sign a deal with the Portuguese to allow trade ships to harbour in Goa. This would have allowed him to open another supply route to Deccan via the sea. This news reached Sambhaji. He attacked the Portuguese territories and forced them back to the Goan coast. But the viceroy of Alvor was able to defend the Portuguese headquarters. By this time the huge Mughal army had started gathering on the borders of Deccan. It was clear that southern India was headed for a large, sustained conflict.

In late 1683, Aurangzeb moved to Ahmednagar. He divided his forces in two and put his two princes, Shah Alam and Azam Shah, in charge of each division. Shah Alam was to attack South Konkan via the Karnataka border while Azam Shah would attack Khandesh and northern Maratha territory. Using a pincer strategy, these two divisions planned to encircle Marathas from the south and north to isolate them. The beginning went quite well. Shah Alam crossed the Krishna river and entered Belgaum. From there he entered Goa and started marching north via Konkan. As he pushed further, he was continuously harassed by Marathas forces. They ransacked his supply chains and reduced his forces to starvation. Finally Aurangzeb sent Ruhulla Khan to his rescue and brought him back to Ahmednagar. The first pincer attempt failed.

After the 1684 monsoon, Aurangzeb's other general Shahbuddin Khan directly attacked the Maratha capital, Raigad. Maratha commanders successfully defended Raigad. Aurangzeb sent Khan Jehan to help, but Hambirao Mohite, commander-in-chief of the Maratha army, defeated him in a fierce battle at Patadi. The second division of the Maratha army attacked Shahbuddin Khan at Pachad, inflicting heavy losses on the Mughal army.

In early 1685, Shah Alam attacked south again via the Gokak-Dharwar route, but Sambhaji's forces harassed him continuously on the way and finally he had to give up and thus failed to close the loop a second time. In April 1685, Aurangzeb changed his strategy. He planned to consolidate his power in the south by undertaking expeditions to the Muslim kingdoms of Golkonda and Bijapur. Both of them were allies of Marathas and Aurangzeb was not fond of them. He broke his treaties with both kingdoms, attacked them and captured them by September 1686. Taking this opportunity, Marathas launched an offensive on the North coast and attacked Bharuch. They were able to evade the Mughal army sent their way and came back with minimum damage. Marathas tried to win Mysore through diplomacy. Sardar Kesopant Pingle was running negotiations, but the fall of Bijapur to the Mughals turned the tides and Mysore was reluctant to join Marathas. Sambhaji successfully courted several Bijapur sardars to join the Maratha army.

Sambhaji led the fight but was captured by the Mughals and killed. His wife and son (Shivaji's grandson) were held captive by Aurangzeb for twenty years.

Execution of Sambhaji  

After the fall of Bijapur and Golkonda, Aurangzeb turned his attention again to the Marathas but his first few attempts had little impact. In January 1688, Sambhaji called together his commanders for a strategic meeting at Sangameshwar in Konkan to decide on the final blow to oust Aurangzeb from the Deccan. To execute the decision of the meeting quickly, Sambhaji sent ahead most of his comrades and stayed back with a few of his trustworthy men, including Kavi Kalash. Ganoji Shirke, one of Sambhaji's brothers-in-law, turned traitor and helped Aurangzeb's commander Muqarrab Khan to locate, reach and attack Sangameshwar while Sambhaji was still there. The relatively small Maratha force fought back although they were surrounded from all sides. Sambhaji was captured on 1 February 1689 and a subsequent rescue attempt by the Marathas was repelled on 11 March.

He was tortured and executed in Aurangzeb's camp on 11 March, 1689. His death surged the Marathas with a newfound zeal and united them against their common foe, Mughal Emperor Aurangzeb.

Marathas under King Rajaram (1689 to 1700)
To Aurangzeb, the Marathas seemed all but dead by end of 1689. But this would prove to be almost a fatal blunder. The death of Sambhaji had rekindled the spirit of the Maratha forces, which made Aurangzeb's mission impossible. Sambhaji's younger brother Rajaram was now given the title of Chhatrapati (Emperor). In March 1690, the Maratha commanders, under the leadership of Santaji Ghorpade launched the single most daring attack on Mughal army. They not only attacked the army, but sacked the tent where the Aurangzeb himself slept. Aurangzeb was elsewhere but his private force and many of his bodyguards were killed. This was followed by a betrayal in the Maratha camp. Raigad fell to the treachery of Suryaji Pisal. Sambhaji's queen, Yesubai and their son, Shahu I, were captured.

Mughal forces, led by Zulfikar Khan, continued this offensive further south. They attacked fort Panhala. The Maratha killedar of Panhala defended the fort and inflicted heavy losses on Mughal army. Finally Aurangzeb himself had to come and Panhala was surrendered.

Maratha capital moved to Jinji

Maratha ministers realised that the Mughals would move on Vishalgad. They insisted that Rajaram leave Vishalgad for Senji (Gingee) (in present Tamil Nadu), which had been captured by Shivaji during his southern conquests and was now to be the new Maratha capital. Rajaram travelled south under escort of Khando Ballal and his men.

Aurangzeb was frustrated with Rajaram's successful escape. Keeping most of his force in Maharashtra, he sent a small number to keep Rajaram in check. This small force was destroyed by an attack from two Maratha generals, Santaji Ghorpade and Dhanaji Jadhav, who then they joined Ramchandra Bavadekar in Deccan. Bavdekar, Vithoji Chavan and Raghuji Bhosale had reorganised most of the Maratha army after defeats at Panhala and Vishalgad.

In late 1691, Bavdekar, Pralhad Niraji, Santaji, Dhanaji and several Maratha sardars met in the Maval region and reformed the strategy. Aurangzeb had taken four major forts in Sahyadrais and was sending Zulfikar khan to subdue the fort Ginjee. According to new Maratha plan, Santaji and Dhanaji would launch offensives in the East to keep rest of the Mughal forces scattered. Others would focus in Maharashtra and would attack a series of forts around southern Maharashtra and northern Karnataka to divide Mughal won territories in two, thereby posing significant challenge to enemy supply chains. Having a strong navy established by Shivaji, the Marathas could now extend this divide into the sea, checking any supply routes from Surat to south.

Now war was fought from the Malwa plateau to the east coast. Such was the strategy of Maratha commanders to counter the might of the Mughals. Maratha generals Ramchandrapant Amatya and Shankaraji Niraji maintained the Maratha stronghold in the rugged terrains of Sahyadri.

Through cavalry movements, Santaji Ghorpade and Dhanaji Jadhav defeated the Mughals. In the Battle of Athani, Santaji defeated Kasim Khan, a noted Mughal general.

Fall of Jinji (January 1698)

Aurangzeb by now had realised that the war he had started was much more serious than he had originally thought. He decided to regroup his forces and rethink his strategy. He sent an ultimatum to Zulfikar Khan to capture Jinji or be stripped of the titles. Zulfikar Khan tightened the siege, but Rajaram escaped and was safely escorted to Deccan by Dhanaji Jadhav and the Shirke brothers. Haraji Mahadik's son took command of Jinji and bravely defended the city against Julfikar Khan and Daud Khan until its fall in January 1698. This gave Rajaram ample amount of time to reach Vishalgad.

After significant Mughal losses, Jinji was captured in a Pyrrhic victory. The fort had done its work: for seven years the three hills of Jinji had kept a large contingent of Mughal forces occupied while inflicting heavy losses. It had significantly depleted Mughal resources in the region, from the treasury to material.

Marathas would soon witness an unpleasant development of their own making. Dhanaji Jadhav and Santaji Ghorpade had a simmering rivalry, which was kept in check by the councilman Pralhad Niraji. But after Niraji's death, Dhanaji grew bold and attacked Santaji. Nagoji Mane, one of Dhanaji's men, killed Santaji. The news of Santaji's death greatly encouraged Aurangzeb and the Mughal army.

But by this time the Mughals were no longer the army they were earlier feared to be. Aurangzeb, against the advice of several of his experienced generals, continued the war.

Revival of Maratha fortunes
The Marathas again consolidated and began a counter-offensive. Rajaram appointed Dhanaji Jadhav as commander-in-chief and the army was split into three divisions, headed by Jadhav himself, Parshuram Timbak and Shankar Narayan. Jadhav defeated a large Mughal force near Pandharpur and Narayan defeated Sarja Khan in Pune. Khanderao Dabhade, who led a division under Jadhav, took Baglan and Nashik, while Nemaji Shinde, a commander with Narayan, scored a major victory at Nandurbar.

Enraged at these defeats, Aurangzeb took charge and launched another counter-offensive. He laid siege to Panhala and attacked the fort of Satara. A seasoned Maratha commander, Prayagji Prabhu, defended Satara for a good six months but surrendered in April 1700, just before the onset of the monsoon. This foiled Aurangzeb's strategy to clear as many forts before the monsoon as possible.

Marathas under Tarabai

In March 1700, Rajaram died. His queen, Tarabai, who was daughter of the Maratha commander-in-chief Hambirrao Mohite, took charge of the Maratha army and continued fighting for the next seven years.

After the Battle of Satara, Aurangzeb contested for every inch of Deccan region at great cost of life and money. Aurangzeb drove west, deep into Maratha territory notably conquering Satara (the Maratha capital) the Marathas expanded eastwards into Mughal lands Hyderabad. Aurangzeb waged continuous war in the Deccan for more than two decades with no resolution and thus lost about a fifth of his army.

Signs of strain were showing in the Mughal camp in late 1701. Asad Khan, Julfikar Khan's father, counselled Aurangzeb to end the war and turn around. The expedition had already taken a giant toll, much larger than originally planned, on the empire and it looked possible that 175 years of Mughal rule might crumble due to being involved in a war that was not winnable.

By 1704, Aurangzeb conquered Torana, Rajgad and some other handful forts mostly by bribing Maratha commanders, but he had spent four precious years for this. It was slowly dawning to him that after 24 years of constant war, he was not succeeded to annex the Maratha State.

The final Maratha counter-offensive gathered momentum in the North, where Mughal provinces fell one by one. They were not in position to defend because the royal treasuries had been sucked dry and no armies were available. In 1705, two Maratha army factions crossed Narmada. One, under the leadership of Nemaji Shinde, hit as far north as Bhopal; the second, headed by Khanderao Dabhade, struck Bharoch and the west. With his 8000 men, Dabhade attacked and defeated Mahomed Khan's forces numbering almost fourteen thousand. This left entire Gujarat coast wide open for Marathas. They immediately tightened their grip on Mughal supply chains. By 1705 end, Marathas had penetrated Mughal possession of Central India and Gujarat. Nemaji Shinde defeated Mughals on the Malwa plateau. In 1706, Mughals started retreating from Maratha dominions.

In Maharashtra, Aurangzeb became despondent. He started negotiations with the Marathas, then cut them abruptly and marched on the small kingdom of Wakinara whose Naik rulers traced their lineage to the royal family of the Vijaynagar empire. His new opponents had never been fond of the Mughals and had sided with the Marathas. Jadhav marched into Sahyadris and won almost all the major forts back in a short time, while those of Satara and Parali were taken by Parshuram Timbak, and Narayan took Sinhgad. Jadhav then turned around, taking his forces to help the Naiks at Wakinara. Wakinara fell but the Naik royal family escaped.

Aurangzeb's death
Aurangzeb had now given up all hope and planned a retreat to Burhanpur. Jadhav attacked and defeated his rearguard but Aurangzeb was able to reach his destination with the help of Zulfikar Khan. He died of a fever on 21 February 1707.

Aftermath of the war

Marathas expanded their territory to include Malwa after the Battle of Delhi and Battle of Bhopal in 1737. By 1757, the Maratha Empire had reached Delhi.

The Mughal empire was split into regional kingdoms, with the Nizam of Hyderabad, Nawab of Oudh and Nawab of Bengal quick to assert the nominal independence of their lands. Anxious to divert the Marathas away from his Deccan strongholds, and to save himself from the Mughal emperor of North India's hostile attempts to suppress his independence, the Nizam encouraged the Marathas to invade Malwa and the northern Indian territories of the Mughal empire. The Nizam says that he could use the Marathas to his own advantage in the Maasir-i Nizami: 
"I consider all this army (Marathas) as my own and I will get my work done through them. It is necessary to take our hands off Malwa. God willing, I will enter into an understanding with them and entrust the Mulukgiri(raiding) on that side of the Narmada to them."

The Mughal–Maratha Wars had a significant impact on the political and social landscape of India. The wars weakened both the Mughal and Maratha empires, paving the way for European colonial powers to establish themselves in India. The wars also contributed to the decline of the Mughal Empire, which was already facing internal political and economic challenges. The Marathas, on the other hand, emerged as a major power in India, and their influence continued to grow in the following centuries.

See also
 Military history of India
 List of people involved in the Maratha Empire
 List of wars involving India
 Rajput War (1679–1707)
 Mughal-Sikh Wars
 Maratha Army

References

Military history of India
Wars involving India
17th-century conflicts
18th-century conflicts
Wars involving the Mughal Empire
17th century in India
18th century in India
Battles fought by Marathas under Sambhaji